Björn Håkan Roxin (born 19 May 1950) is a Swedish curler.

Teams

Personal life
His three brothers – Claes, Göran and Lars-Eric – are also curlers.

References

External links
 

Living people
1950 births
Swedish male curlers
Swedish curling champions
20th-century Swedish people